Bago Region (formerly Pegu Division and Bago Division) is an administrative region of Myanmar, located in the southern central part of the country. It is bordered by Magway Region and Mandalay Region to the north; Kayin State, Mon State and the Gulf of Martaban to the east; Yangon Region to the south and Ayeyarwady Region and Rakhine State to the west. It is located between 46°45'N and 19°20'N and 94°35'E and 97°10'E. It has a population of 4,867,373 (2014).

History
According to legend, two Mon princes from Thaton founded the city of Bago in 573 AD. They saw a female Hamsa standing on the back of a male Hamsa on an island in a huge lake. Believing this was an auspicious omen, the princes built a city called Hanthawady (Pali: Hamsavati) on the edge of the lake.

The Arab geographer Ibn Khordadbeh mentions the city around 850 AD. The Mon capital was still in Thaton at that time. The Thiruvalangadu plate describe Rajendra Chola I, the Chola Emperor from South India, as having conquered "Kadaram" in the fourteenth year of his reign- 1028 CE. According to one interpretation, Kadaram refers to Bago. More modern interpretations understand Kadaram to be Kedah in modern day Malaysia, instead of Bago. The earliest reliable external record of Bago comes from Chinese sources that mention Jayavarman VII adding Pegu to the territory of the Khmer Empire in 1195. The Bamar from Bagan ruled the area in 1056. After the collapse of Bagan to the Mongols in 1287, the Mon regained their independence.

From 1369–1539, Hanthawady was the capital of the Hanthawaddy Kingdom, which covered all of what is now lower Burma. The area came under Burman control again in 1539, when it was annexed by King Tabinshwehti of Kingdom of Taungoo. The kings of Taungoo made Bago their royal capital from 1539–1599, and used it as a base for their repeated invasions of Siam. As a major seaport, the city was frequently visited by Europeans, who commented on its magnificence. The Burmese capital was relocated to Ava in 1634. In 1740, the Mon revolted and briefly regained their independence, but Burmese King Alaungpaya sacked and completely destroyed the city (along with Mon independence) in 1757.

Burmese King Bodawpaya (1782–1819) rebuilt Bago, but by then the river had shifted course, cutting the city off from the sea. It never regained its previous importance. After the Second Anglo-Burmese War, the British annexed Bago in 1852. In 1862, with the formation of the province of British Burma, the capital was moved to Yangon.

Administrative divisions

Bago Region occupies an area of  divided into the four districts of Bago, Pyay, Tharrawaddy and Taungoo. Bago, the divisional capital, is the fourth largest town of Burma. Other major cities include Taungoo and Pyay.

Bago Region's seal are two sibling hintha (Hamsa), due to historic Mon influences in the area.

Government

Executive
Bago Region Government

Legislature

Judiciary
Bago Region High Court

Transport
Bago Region is served by Pyay Airport.

Demographics

The total population of Bago Region is 4,863,455 according to 2014 Burma Census with Bamar, Karen, Mon, Chin, Rakhine, Shan, South Asians, Chinese, and Pa-O ethnic groups represented. Burmese language is the lingua franca.

Religion
According to the 2014 Myanmar Census, Buddhists make up 93.5% of Bago Region’s population, forming the largest religious community there. Minority religious communities include Christians (2.9%), Muslims (1.2%), Hindus (2.1%), and animists (0.1%) who collectively comprise the remainder of Bago Region’s population. 0.3% of the population listed no religion, other religions, or were otherwise not enumerated.

According to the State Sangha Maha Nayaka Committee’s 2016 statistics, 50,198 Buddhist monks were registered in Bago Region, comprising 9.4% of Myanmar's total Sangha membership, which includes both novice samanera and fully-ordained bhikkhu. The majority of monks belong to the Thudhamma Nikaya (77.3%), followed by Shwegyin Nikaya (16.7%), with the remainder of monks belonging to other small monastic orders. 5,100 thilashin were registered in Bago Region, comprising 8.4% of Myanmar’s total thilashin community.

Economy
The division's economy is strongly dependent on the timber trade. Taungoo, in the northern end of the Bago Region, is bordered by mountain ranges, home to teak and other hardwoods. Another natural resource is petroleum. The major crop is rice, occupying over two-thirds of the available agricultural land.  Other major crops include betel nut, sugarcane, maize, groundnut, sesamum, sunflower, beans and pulses, cotton, jute, rubber, tobacco, tapioca, banana, Nipa palm and toddy. Industry includes fisheries, salt, ceramics, sugar, paper, plywood, distilleries, and monosodium glutamate.

The division has a small livestock breeding and fisheries sector, and a small industrial sector.

The major tourist sites of the Bago Region can be reached as a day trip from Yangon.

Hydropower plant
The Shwegyin Dam is in the eastern part Bago Region. It is equipped with four 18.75-MW Francis vertical shaft turbines. It can generate 262 million KW hours per year.

The construction of the dam was launched in 2003. The first power station was opened on 29 December 2009, the second on 25 March 2011, the third on 2 June 2011 and the fourth on 21 July 2011. It was inaugurated on 22 October 2011.

Education

 Bago University, Bago
 Computer University, Pyay
 Computer University, Taungoo
 Pyay Education College
 Pyay Technological University
 Pyay University
 Taungoo Educational College
 Taungoo University
 Technological University, Taungoo
 Paku Divinity School

Educational opportunities in Myanmar are extremely limited outside the main cities of Yangon and Mandalay. In 2005, Bago Region had 578 post-primary schools, 119 middle schools and 132 high schools.
The following is a summary of the division public school system for the academic year of 2002–2003.

The division is home to one national university, Pyay Technological University and two local universities, Pyay University and Taungoo University.

Health
The general state of health care in Myanmar is poor. The military government spends anywhere from 0.5% to 3% of the country's GDP on health care, consistently ranking among the lowest in the world. Although health care is nominally free, in reality, patients have to pay for medicine and treatment, even in public clinics and hospitals. Public hospitals lack many of the basic facilities and equipment. Moreover, the health care infrastructure outside of Yangon and Mandalay is extremely poor. For example, in 2003, Bago Region had less than a quarter of hospital beds than Yangon Region whose population was just slighter greater. More shocking still, in 2005, this division of five million had only 399 doctors in its public hospitals.

Notable sites
Kyaikpun Buddha
Shwemawdaw Pagoda
Shwethalyaung Buddha
Kanbawzathadi Palace

References

External links
Bago Region Government Official Website
 "Bago Region (East), Myanmar" map, 21 March 2011, Myanmar Information Management Unit (MIMU)
 "Bago Region (West), Myanmar" map, 21 March 2011, Myanmar Information Management Unit (MIMU)

 
Regions of Myanmar